Five men known as sons of Yagbe'u Seyon ruled as Emperor of Ethiopia in succession between 1294 and 1299. Their names were:

Senfa Ared IV (1294–1295)
Hezba Asgad (1295–1296)
Qedma Asgad (1296–1297)
Jin Asgad (1297–1298)
Saba Asgad (1298–1299)

Though later tradition remembered them as sons of Yagbe'u Seyon, their actual relationship is not clear, though they did succeed him.

Reigns
Yagbe'u Seyon's five successors ruled Ethiopia between his reign and that of Wedem Arad. Although all of the primary sources agree that Yagbe'u Seyon and Wedem Arad were sons of Yekuno Amlak, sources disagree about how these five are related to each other and the previous two Emperors. Both James Bruce and the traditions collected by Antoine d'Abbadie state that these were the sons of Yekuno Amlak, yet the oldest surviving list of Ethiopian kings lists four of these five (omitting Saba Asgad) without any mention of their filial relationship. The Gadla of Saint Basalota Mika’el, however, does state that Qedma Asgad was the son of Yekuno Amlak.

Historians disagree over the situation that his successors experienced. Paul B. Henze states that Yagbe'u Seyon could not decide which of his sons should inherit his kingdom, and instructed that each would rule in turn for a year. Taddesse Tamrat, on the other hand, records that his reign was followed by dynastic confusion, during which each of his sons held the throne. E.A. Wallis Budge adds the tradition that Jin Asgad initiated the use of Amba Geshen as a royal prison for troublesome relatives of the Emperor, when he was forced to imprison his treacherous brother Saba Asgad; at the same time he imprisoned his other three brothers and his own sons in Amba Geshen.

Whatever the succession situation truly was, it came to an end when Wedem Arad seized the throne.

References 

13th-century emperors of Ethiopia
13th-century monarchs in Africa
Quintets